Ryszard Pacławski (born 1958 in Sanok, Poland) is a Polish lawyer,
Scoutmaster (harcmistrz) and former Naczelnik ZHP (Chief Scout) from 1991 until 2000.

References

1958 births
Living people
20th-century Polish lawyers
Polish Scouts and Guides
21st-century Polish lawyers